Leonardo is a petascale supercomputer currently under construction at the CINECA datacenter in Bologna, Italy. The system consists of an Atos BullSequana XH2000 computer, with close to 14,000 Nvidia Ampere GPUs and 200Gb/s Nvidia Mellanox HDR InfiniBand connectivity. Once completed, Leonardo will be capable of 250 petaflops (250 quadrillion operations per second), which will make it one of the top five fastest supercomputers in the world. Leonardo's components arrived on site in July 2022, and it is scheduled to begin operations by the end of summer 2022.

Architecture 
The system is constructed as three separate "modules". The first, known as the "booster module", consists of 13,824 Nvidia A100 GPUs, grouped four per node, for a total of 3,456 nodes. This module will be capable of 240.50 LINPACK petaflops, and is expected to be online by autumn 2022. The second module, called the "data centric module", is made up of 1,536 Intel Sapphire Rapids CPUs, and will be capable of 8.97 LINPACK petaflops. These two computing modules will be complemented by a "front-end & service module", and backed by two storage systems; 5 PB of high IOPS storage with 1 TB/s bandwidth and 100 PB of high capacity storage with 500 GB/s bandwidth. The components will be joined up by a 200 Gb/s InfiniBand interconnect.

Booster Module 
The 3,456 individual nodes which make up the "booster module" are custom BullSequana X2135 "Da Vinci" blade servers, each composed of:

 1x Intel Xeon 8358 CPU, with 32 cores running at 2.6 GHz
 512 GB RAM DDR4 3200 MHz
 4x NVidia custom Ampere GPU, 64GB HBM2
 2x NVidia HDR InfiniBand network adapters, each with two 100 Gb/s ports

Each node is expected to deliver 89.4 TFLOPs peak.

Data Centric Module 
The "data centric module" consists of 1536 nodes, each comprising a BullSequana X2610 compute blade with: 

 2x Intel Sapphire Rapids CPUs, with 56 cores 
 512 GB RAM DDR5 4800 MHz
 1x NVidia HDR InfiniBand network adapter, with one 100 Gb/s port
 8 TB NVM storage

Front-end & Service Module 
This module is responsible for login handling, visualisation and system service and management. It consists of 16 nodes, each having: 

 2x Ice Lake CPUs, with 32 cores 
 512 GB RAM 
 1x NVidia HDR InfiniBand network adapter, with two 100 Gb/s ports
 6 TB disk storage in RAID-1 configuration

16 additional nodes are also equipped with:

 2x NVidia Quadro RTX8000 48GB (for visualisations)
 6.4 TB NVMe disk array

Storage 
Leonardo will have access to two storage tiers: 

 A "fast" tier based on 31x DDN Exascaler ES400NVX2 appliances, each with 24x 7.68 TB NVMe SSDs 
 A "capacity" tier based on 31x DDN EXAScaler SFA799X appliances, with 82x 18 TB HDD SAS 7200 rpm and two JBOD expansions per appliance, each with 82x 18 TB HDD SAS 7200 rpm

Funding 
Leonardo is part of the European High-Performance Computing Joint Undertaking, and receives €120 million in funding from the EU. This is matched by a further €120 million from the Italian Ministry of Education, University and Research.

Bologna Technopole 
The building housing Leonardo is known as the Bologna Technopole, and used to be home to a tobacco factory. It was built in 1952 by Pier Luigi Nervi, who was famous for his innovative use of reinforced concrete. In addition to Leonardo, the building also houses the European Centre for Medium-Range Weather Forecasts' new supercomputer, consisting of four Atos BullSequana XH2000 clusters, which replaces their earlier facility in Reading, England.

See also 

 LUMI, another EuroHPC supercomputer based in Kajaani, Finland.
 EuroHPC (European High-Performance Computing Joint Undertaking).

References 

Supercomputers
Supercomputing in Europe